Borenore is a closed railway station on the Broken Hill railway line in New South Wales, Australia. The station opened in 1885, and the building survives largely intact. They were in use by the local tennis club however, this is no longer the case and the buildings are disused and locked with the exception of the station bathrooms.

References

Disused regional railway stations in New South Wales
Railway stations in Australia opened in 1885